Angela Miller  (born December 8, 1970) is a retired American female volleyball player. She was part of the United States women's national volleyball team.

She participated in the 1994 FIVB Volleyball Women's World Championship. On club level she played with Lsu.

Clubs
 Lsu (1994)

References

1970 births
Living people
American women's volleyball players
Place of birth missing (living people)
Competitors at the 1994 Goodwill Games
Goodwill Games medalists in volleyball
21st-century American women
LSU Tigers women's volleyball players